Aldyn Wint (born 19 September 1958) is a Caymanian former cyclist. He competed in the individual road race and the team time trial events at the 1984 Summer Olympics.

References

External links
 

1958 births
Living people
Caymanian male cyclists
Olympic cyclists of the Cayman Islands
Cyclists at the 1984 Summer Olympics
Place of birth missing (living people)